The 1979 Australian Grand Prix was an open-wheel racing car race held at Wanneroo Raceway north of Perth in Western Australia on 11 March 1979.

The race, which was the first round of the 1979 Australian Drivers' Championship, was open to racing cars complying with Australian Formula 1 (incorporating Formula 5000 and Formula Pacific). It was recognised by the Confederation of Australian Motor Sport as the 44th Australian Grand Prix and was the only Australian Grand Prix to be held at Wanneroo Raceway.

Classification 
Results as follows:

Qualifying

Race

Notes
 Pole position: Alfredo Costanzo - 52.11
 Fastest lap: John Wright / John Walker - 54.92, 158.20 km/h (98.30 mph)
 Winner's average speed: 154.20 km/h (95.30 mph)

References

External links
 John Walker & Lola T332 -1979 AGP images (refer page 32), www.austin7clubsa.com.au
 Results of the 1979 Australian Grand Prix, www.terrywalkersplace.com (refer page 3) 

Grand Prix
Australian Grand Prix
Formula 5000 race reports
Australian Grand Prix